The Red Tree may refer to:

 The Red Tree (Shaun Tan), a children's book written by Shaun Tan
 The Red Tree, a novel written by Caitlín R. Kiernan
 The Red Tree (album), an album by Canadian band Moneen
 The Red Tree (band), an Australian Band with members, Nick van Cuylenburg, Cameron Gough and Daphne Do.
 The Red Tree (Mondrian), is a painting by Piet Mondrian.